Novopovalikha is a rural locality (a selo) in Pervomaysky Selsoviet, Pervomaysky District, Altai Krai, Russia. The population was 342 as of 2013. There are 6 streets.

Geography 
Novopovalikha is located 49 km north of Novoaltaysk (the district's administrative centre) by road. Pervomayskoye is the nearest rural locality.

References 

Rural localities in Pervomaysky District, Altai Krai